Ivan Vasilyevich Plotnikov (1902–1995) was a Soviet engineer and inventor of kirza, a type of artificial leather based on the multi-layer textile fabric, modified by membrana-like substances, a cheap and effective replacement for the natural leather. The material is mainly used in production of military boots and the belts for machinery and automobiles.

Plotnikov worked in the city of Kirov, at the Kirov plant or Kirovskiy Zavod, a fabric producing artificial leather. The name kirza is an acronym from Kirovskiy Zavod, which was the first place of the mass production of kirza.

The technology was invented in 1935 by Plotnikov and his fellow engineer Khomutov. The mass production began during the Winter War of the Soviet Union against Finland. Initially the material proved to be unfit to the winter conditions, and the production was halted. However, very soon the technology was improved and the mass production was resumed in the autumn and winter of 1941 during the German invasion of Soviet Union, since the large numbers of footwear were badly needed for the Red Army.

For the invention of kirza, Ivan Plotnikov was awarded the Stalin Prize the size of 100,000 rubles on 10 April 1942, as ordered by the Council of People's Commissars of the Soviet Union.

References 

Stalin Prize winners
1995 deaths
1902 births
D. Mendeleev University of Chemical Technology of Russia alumni
Soviet inventors
Soviet engineers